The Radulomycetaceae are a family of fungi in the order Agaricales.

The family was introduced in 2020 based on phylogenetic analysis and incorporates the genera Aphanobasidium, Radulomyces and Radulotubus.

Taxonomy 
Radulomycetaceae was circumscribed by the mycologists Caio A. Leal-Dutra, Bryn Tjader Mason Dentinger and Gareth W. Griffith in 2020.

Etymology 
the family name Radulomycetaceae is derived from the name of the type genus, Radulomyces.

See also 
 List of Agaricales families

References 

Agaricales families
Agaricales
Taxa described in 2020